Rıza Çalımbay (born 2 February 1963) is a UEFA Pro Licensed Turkish football manager and former player who is currently the manager of Sivasspor. He was one of the symbol names of Beşiktaş and was among the best players of his time. Because of his determination and hard work he was nicknamed Atom Ant (in Turkish, "Atom Karınca").

Playing career
Born in Sivas, Turkey, Çalımbay started playing football in Beşiktaş academy. He debuted with the Beşiktaş first team in 1980–81 season. Until his retirement in 1995–96 season., he played only for Beşiktaş, and for the Turkey national football team, although he played in the UNICEF-world team against Germany and caught the eye of many clubs like Marseille but Çalımbay would not leave Beşiktaş. He played 494 league games for Beşiktaş and scored 43 goals. He holds the record for most appearances for Beşiktaş. He was also the captain of the team. He also played 38 times for Turkey.

Managerial career
After retiring from football, Çalımbay took manager courses in England. In 2001, he became the assistant manager for Christoph Daum at Beşiktaş but after a short time he resigned, and became the manager of Göztepe, Denizlispor and Çaykur Rizespor. He was especially successful at Denizlispor, leading the team to latter stages in the 2002–03 UEFA Cup season eliminating teams like Sparta Prague and the mighty Olympique Lyonnais side of Paul Le Guen. The Porto side of José Mourinho ended the UEFA Cup dreams of Denizlispor and Çalımbay after an 8–3 win on aggregate. In 2004–05 season, he became the manager of Beşiktaş after Vicente Del Bosque was sacked. That season Beşiktaş was having really bad results and the squad was in a bad mood. But after Çalımbay took control the team started to perform really well. Çalımbay changed the system back to a 3–5–2 formation the usual formation and began playing good football he also picked a 4–3 win over rivals Fenerbahçe in the Şükrü Saracoğlu Stadium. However in the 2005–06 season, Beşiktaş was performing bad once again, Despite 2005–06 UEFA Cup wins against FC Vaduz and Malmö FF a 1–2 home defeat by Fenerbahçe took the coach into troubled waters. Çalımbay resigned in the 9th week after a 0–0 draw against Kayserispor. Jean Tigana became the manager of Beşiktaş after him. He then coached Ankaraspor but resigned after a few matches. Çalımbay signed a 1.5 year contract with again Çaykur Rizespor, although he had options to coach abroad in Iran and Germany but he chose Çaykur Rizespor. He then coached respectively Eskişehirspor, Sivasspor, Çaykur Rizespor, Mersin İdmanyurdu and Kasımpaşa. On 10 October 2016 he signed a 2 year deal with Antalyaspor.

Çalımbay was named the manager of Sivasspor for his second stint in 2019. He helped the club win the 2021–22 Turkish Cup, the first major honour in the club's history.

Career statistics

Player

Club

International

Manager

Honours

Player
Beşiktaş
 1.Lig: 1981–82, 1985–86, 1989–90, 1990–91, 1991–92, 1994–95
 Turkish Cup: 1988–89, 1989–90, 1993–94
 Turkish Super Cup: 1986, 1989, 1992, 1994
 Chancellor Cup: 1988
 TSYD Cup: 1983, 1984, 1988, 1989, 1990, 1993, 1996

Individual
 Beşiktaş Team of the Century

Records
 Beşiktaş All-Time Appearance Maker: 645 games
 Beşiktaş All-Time Appearance Maker in Süper Lig: 494 games

Manager
Sivasspor
Turkish Cup: 2021–22

See also
List of one-club men

References

External links
 Profile at TFF.org
 Profile at Mackolik.com
 

1963 births
Living people
Association football wingers
Turkish footballers
Turkey international footballers
Turkey under-21 international footballers
Turkey youth international footballers
Beşiktaş J.K. footballers
Beşiktaş J.K. managers
Eskişehirspor managers
Antalyaspor managers
Trabzonspor managers
Turkish football managers
Süper Lig players
Süper Lig managers
Mediterranean Games silver medalists for Turkey
Mediterranean Games medalists in football
Competitors at the 1983 Mediterranean Games